Agestrata orichalca is a species of beetles of the family Scarabaeidae.

Description
Body of these beetles is broad, oblong, a little flat and the basic color is shiny, metallic green.

Distribution
This species can be found in South-eastern Asia (Northern India, Sri Lanka, China, Thailand, Vietnam, Sulawesi, Flores Isl., Komodo Isl., Lombok Isl.).

References

Scarabaeidae
Beetles described in 1769
Taxa named by Carl Linnaeus